James Everett "Rhett" Lawrence is an American record producer and songwriter. He has produced, mentored, and helped launch the career of 5 artists amongst the top 200 artists to be featured on Billboard magazine's top charts from 1955 to 2012, who have sold over 350,000,000 records worldwide. Many of these artists are also in the Rock and Roll Hall of Fame.

He is originally famous for producing the Grammy Award–winning, Billboard No. 1 single "Vision of Love" for Mariah Carey.

He has produced and written songs for the likes of Rock and Roll Hall of Fame inductees Whitney Houston,  Earth Wind and Fire, Little Richard, Philip Bailey, Gladys Knight, Jon Anderson (Yes), Anderson Bruford Wakeman Howe, pop artists Enrique Iglesias, Selena, Paula Abdul with Ofra Haza, Hilary Duff, Jessica Simpson, 98 Degrees, Carola Häggkvist (Eurovision winner from Sweden), June Pointer of the legendary Pop/R&B group The Pointer Sisters, and  BeBe & CeCe Winans, Kirk Franklin, the Andrae and Sandra Crouch Choir, and Crystal Lewis.

He produced and co-wrote the single "Never Be The Same Again" with Melanie C of The Spice Girls and Lisa "Left Eye" Lopes of TLC, which was No. 1 in seven countries. He wrote the No. 1 single "Angel of Mine" recorded by Monica and Eternal and co-wrote the No. 1 UK song “I Wanna Be the Only One” for Eternal featuring BeBe Winans.

Programmer, arranger and studio musician 

Prior to becoming a producer, Lawrence was a programmer, arranger and studio musician in Los Angeles and New York. Some of the artists he worked with during this period include Michael Jackson on his Bad and Dangerous albums, Van Halen, Crosby Stills Nash and Young, Stevie Wonder, Gladys Knight, Anderson Bruford Wakeman Howe (a Yes spin-off), Earth Wind and Fire, Neil Diamond, Chicago ("Will You Still Love Me"), and Quincy Jones (2 solo albums, Jackson, and Barbra Streisand), rock artists Billy Preston, Boz Scaggs and Roger Hodgson (formerly of Supertramp), pop artists Richard Marx, Belinda Carlisle ("Heaven is a Place On Earth"), easy listening artists Julio Iglesias, and David Foster, jazz artists Larry Carlton, George Benson and Earl Klugh, funk artists The Gap Band and The Dazz Band, and gospel artists Phil Keaggy and Andrae Crouch. He also programmed the distinctive drum loop (with Maurice Gibb and Scott Glasel) for the Bee Gees' "You Win Again (Bee Gees song)" that sold over 3 million copies worldwide, while working on multiple projects with them and Arif Mardin.

Songwriting 

He produced and co-wrote Kelly Clarkson's first single following her American Idol victory, "Miss Independent", which was at No. 1 for 6 weeks on Top 40 Radio and received a Grammy Award nomination for Best Female Pop Vocal Performance.  Lawrence's second collaboration with Clarkson led to the creation of a new anthem for Ford Motor Company titled "Go". The song was introduced first during American Idol and was inspired by Lawrence's love for Ford's anniversary re-issue of the GT40 Lemans race car, the Ford GT.  "Go" became Ford's theme song for television and radio advertising in North and South America for one year, and led to Ford sponsoring Clarkson's tour for two years.  Ford and Clarkson gave away a Ford Mustang or Ford Fusion to a lucky audience member at each concert.

Lawrence produced and co-wrote the Billboard No. 2 Rap single “Request + Line” for The Black Eyed Peas featuring Macy Gray, which gave them their first top 40 hit.

Equipment and studio

In addition to the use of synthesizers, Lawrence pioneered the use of computers and sampling on albums and was the first studio musician in Los Angeles to own and use the Fairlight CMI (Computer Music Instrument). Lawrence was an early advisor to Digidesign (later Avid Technology) and would later become the first producer to mix an album using Pro Tools, alongside legendary mixer Dave Pensado. Lawrence and Pensado kept teaming up through the years after this.

Lawrence also owns and records with a large collection of vintage guitars and recording equipment including Jimi Hendrix's first Marshall amplifier which was given to Hendrix by Kit Lambert, manager of The Who during the 1960s, after its guitarist and original owner, Pete Townshend, had switched amplifier companies.

References

Living people
Year of birth missing (living people)
American record producers
Place of birth missing (living people)